Mercadera (1245-1300), was a Spanish war heroine of the Aragonese Crusade.

In 1285, France invaded Aragonese Empordà and Roussillon and placed the city of Peralada under siege. Mercadera was a manufacturer of ornaments for clothing such as bands and ribbons. Similar to other citizens, she had a garden outside the city walls which provided an important food supply, but did not dare to tend to it during the siege for fear of sexual assault from the enemy soldiers. Instead, she dressed herself as a man to tend to her garden outside the walls. When doing so, she wounded and took a French knight prisoner before returning to the city, herself wounded, and handed him over to the Aragonese authorities. King Peter III of Aragon had her repeat her tale to him several times and awarded her the armor and weapons of the French knight, which was customary for a warrior capturing an enemy: the incident attracted great attention and she was hailed as a patriotic Aragonese heroine of the war.

References
 «Diccionari Biogràfic de Dones: Mercadera, na»

13th-century people from the Kingdom of Aragon
Women in medieval European warfare
Women in 13th-century warfare
1245 births
1300 deaths
Female wartime cross-dressers